Yangpyeong-dong is a dong, neighborhood of Yeongdeungpo-gu in Seoul, South Korea.

Outline 
Yangpyeong-dong is bordered by Yangcheon-gu to the west, Dangsan-dong to the east, and Munnae-dong to the south.
Yangpyeong-dong was Yangpyeong-ri Sangbuk-myeon, Geumcheon-hyun, Gyeonggi-do during the Joseon era.

Education 
 Dangsan Elementary school
 Seonyoo Elementary school
 Seonyoo Middle school
 Han-gang Media High school
 Seonyoo High school
 Gwanak High school

See also 
Administrative divisions of South Korea

References

External links
Yeongdeungpo-gu official website
Yeongdeungpo-gu map at The Yeongdeungpo-gu official website
 Yangpyeong 1-dong resident office website

Neighbourhoods of Yeongdeungpo District